Valērijs Ivanovs (born 23 February 1970 in Riga) is a former football midfielder from Latvia. He played 69 international matches and scored 1 goal for the Latvia national team between 1992 and 2001. His clubs include FC Skonto (1995–1997), Helsingborgs IF, Uralan Elista, Shinnik Yaroslavl and Volgar GazProm Astrakhan.

Honours
RAF Jelgava
Latvian Higher League runner-up: 1992, 1993
Latvian Football Cup winner: 1993

Skonto
Latvian Higher League champion: 1995, 1996, 1997
Latvian Football Cup winner: 1995, 1997
Latvian Football Cup runner-up: 1996

Helsingborgs
Svenska Cupen runner-up: 1993–94

Latvia
Baltic Cup winner: 1993, 1995

External links
 

1970 births
Living people
Soviet footballers
FK Jelgava players
Latvian footballers
Helsingborgs IF players
Latvian expatriate footballers
Expatriate footballers in Sweden
Skonto FC players
Latvian Higher League players
FC Elista players
Russian Premier League players
Expatriate footballers in Russia
FC Shinnik Yaroslavl players
PFC Spartak Varna players
First Professional Football League (Bulgaria) players
Expatriate footballers in Bulgaria
FC Volgar Astrakhan players
Latvia international footballers
Latvian expatriate sportspeople in Russia
Footballers from Riga
Association football midfielders